"Locking Up the Sun" is the fourth track of the album Carnival of Rust by the Finnish rock band Poets of the Fall. A single version of the song has been released in Finland on 29 November 2006. It includes the title track, a remix entitled "The Absolution" done by Captain and the music video directed by Tuomas "stObe" Harju, who shot two of the band's previous clips, as well. The video started to be aired on Finnish television stations at the beginning of November 2006. The single peaked at number three in the official Finnish single charts.

Track listing 1 song but there biggest hit 
 "Locking Up the Sun" (album version) (03:57)
 "The Absolution" (Locking Up the Sun Remix) (04:54)
Bonus: Locking Up the Sun music video

Nominations

Charts

References

External links
"Locking Up the Sun" lyrics
"Locking Up the Sun" video
The official website of Poets of the Fall
The official MySpace of Poets of the Fall (contains a full version of "Locking up the Sun" to listen to)

Poets of the Fall songs
2006 singles
2006 songs